Mbarara Airport  is a civilian airport that serves the town of Mbarara in Ankole sub-region, Uganda. It is one of 12 upcountry airports administered by the Civil Aviation Authority of Uganda. The airport was originally named Nyakisharara Airport.

See also

List of airports in Uganda
Transport in Uganda

References

External links
OpenStreetMap - Mbarara Airport
SkyVector - Mbarara Airport
OurAirports - Mbarara Airport
Uganda Civil Aviation Authority Homepage

Airports in Uganda
Mbarara District
Western Region, Uganda